The Max Planck Institute for Polymer Research is a scientific center in the field of polymer science located in Mainz, Germany. The institute was founded in 1983 by Erhard W. Fischer and Gerhard Wegner. Belonging to the Chemistry, Physics and Technology Section, it is one of the 80 institutes in the Max Planck Society (Max-Planck-Gesellschaft).

Research
Using a basic research approach, its scientists strive to design and characterize innovative applications in the fields of electronics, energy technology, medicine and nanomaterials. The institute specializes in new approaches to synthesis, supramolecular architectures, developing new methods, functional materials and components, structure and dynamics and surfaces and interfaces.

Organization
The beginning of 2014 saw a total of 511 people working at the institute, of whom 134 were supported by third-party funding and 79 were privately sponsored. The workforce was made up of 123 scientists, 150 doctoral and diploma students, 41 visiting scientists and 164 technical, administrative and auxiliary staff, altogether from approximately 40 different countries.

Departments
The MPIP consists of six departments each managed by a director:

 Molecular Electronics, Paul Blom
 Molecular Spectroscopy, Mischa Bonn
 Physics of Interfaces, Hans-Jürgen Butt
 Polymer Theory, Kurt Kremer
 Physical Chemistry of Polymers, Katharina Landfester
 Synthesis of Macromolecules, Tanja Weil

Emeriti and former directors
Emeriti
 Hans-Wolfgang Spiess, Director, Polymer Spectroscopy (1985-2012)
 Gerhard Wegner, Director, Solid State Chemistry (1983-2008)

Former Directors
 Erhard E. Fischer, Director, Polymer Physics (1983-1997)
 Wolfgang Knoll, Director, Material Science (1993-2008)

Graduate programs
The International Max Planck Research School for Polymer Materials is a graduate program offering a doctorate degree. The school is run in cooperation with the Johannes Gutenberg University of Mainz.

The Max Planck Graduate Center (MPGC) is a virtual department across the MPIP, the Max Planck Institute for Chemistry, and four faculties of the Johannes Gutenberg University of Mainz, created for interdisciplinary projects. It offers a PhD program in these research topics to candidates from all over the world.

References

External links
 Portrait of the Max Planck Institute for Polymer Research at the Homepage of the Max Planck Society
 Homepage of the Max Planck Graduate Center (MPGC)

 
Polymer Research
Chemical research institutes
Materials science institutes